Al-Rifai Sport Club is an Iraqi football team based in Al-Rifa'i, Dhi Qar, that plays in Iraq Division Two.

Managerial history
  Rasheed Sayer
 Hader Jassim
 Haider Radhi

See also 
 2001–02 Iraq FA Cup
 2002–03 Iraq FA Cup
 2021–22 Iraq FA Cup

References

External links
 Al-Rifai SC on Goalzz.com
 Iraq Clubs- Foundation Dates

1990 establishments in Iraq
Association football clubs established in 1990
Football clubs in Dhi Qar